Ouango Fitini Airport is an airport serving Ouango Fitini in Côte d'Ivoire.

Airports in Ivory Coast
Buildings and structures in Zanzan District
Bounkani